The 2011 Rijeka Open (also known as the 2011 Rijeka Open powered by INA for sponsorship purposes) was a professional tennis tournament played on clay courts. It was the fifth edition of the tournament which was part of the 2011 ATP Challenger Tour. It took place in Rijeka, Croatia between 30 May and 5 June 2011.

Singles main draw entrants

Seeds

 Rankings are as of May 23, 2011.

Other entrants
The following players received wildcards into the singles main draw:
  Dino Marcan
  Nikola Mektić
  Kristijan Mesaroš
  Borut Puc

The following players received entry as an alternate into the singles main draw:
  Antonio Veić

The following players received entry from the qualifying draw:
  Andrea Arnaboldi
  Nicolas Devilder
  Pedro Sousa
  Gabriel Trujillo Soler

Champions

Singles

 Rui Machado def.  Grega Žemlja, 6–3, 6–0

Doubles

 Paolo Lorenzi /  Júlio Silva  def.  Lovro Zovko /    Dino Marcan, 6–3, 6–2

External links
ITF Search
ATP official site

Rijeka Open
2011 in Croatian tennis
Rijeka Open